Bernie Perryman (born January 8, 1959) is an American politician serving in the Minnesota House of Representatives since 2023. A member of the Republican Party of Minnesota, Perryman represents District 14A in central Minnesota, which includes the cites of St. Cloud and Waite Park and parts of Stearns County.

Early life, education and career 
Perryman graduated from Quincy College with a bachelor's degree in marketing. She moved to St. Cloud, Minnesota, in 1999, and worked as commissioner of the St. Cloud City Economic Development Authority.

Minnesota House of Representatives 
Perryman was elected to the Minnesota House of Representatives in 2022, after the retirement of Republican incumbent Tama Theis, who ran for a seat in the Minnesota Senate. Perryman serves on the Commerce Finance and Policy, Economic Development Finance and Policy, and Health Finance and Policy Committees.

Electoral history

Personal life 
Perryman lives in St. Augusta, Minnesota, with her spouse, Keith.

References

External links 

Living people
1959 births
Republican Party members of the Minnesota House of Representatives
21st-century American politicians